Phanotea is a genus of spiders in the family Zoropsidae. It was first described in 1896 by Simon. , it contains 13 species, all from South Africa.

Species

Phanotea comprises the following species:
Phanotea cavata Griswold, 1994
Phanotea ceratogyna Griswold, 1994
Phanotea digitata Griswold, 1994
Phanotea knysna Griswold, 1994
Phanotea lata Griswold, 1994
Phanotea latebricola Lawrence, 1952
Phanotea margarita Griswold, 1994
Phanotea natalensis Lawrence, 1951
Phanotea orestria Griswold, 1994
Phanotea peringueyi Simon, 1896
Phanotea sathegyna Griswold, 1994
Phanotea simoni Lawrence, 1951
Phanotea xhosa Griswold, 1994

References

Zoropsidae
Araneomorphae genera
Spiders of South Africa